Michael G. Scott (born April 18, 1954) was a Reform Party of Canada and later Canadian Alliance Party Member of Parliament in the House of Commons of Canada from 1993 to 2000.  Scott represented the riding of Skeena (now Skeena—Bulkley Valley), in Northwestern British Columbia.

In 2006, Scott once again ran in same riding for the Conservative Party.  He lost to NDP incumbent Nathan Cullen.

References

External links
 

1954 births
Living people
Members of the House of Commons of Canada from British Columbia
Reform Party of Canada MPs